Lake Virginia is a lake located in the Sierra Nevada (John Muir Wilderness) in Fresno County, California. It drains into Fish Creek, in the Cascade Valley.  The John Muir Trail passes along its northern shore. It is not to be confused with Virginia Lakes, a cluster of lakes lying to the north.

See also
 List of lakes in California

References

Lakes of Fresno County, California
Mountain lakes
Lakes of California
Lakes of Northern California